FriCAS is a general purpose computer algebra system with a strong focus on mathematical research and development of new algorithms. It comprises an interpreter, a compiler and a still-growing library
of more than 1,000 domains and categories.

FriCAS provides a strongly typed high-level programming language called SPAD and a similar interactive language
that uses type-inferencing for convenience. Aldor was intentionally developed being the 
next generation compiler for the Axiom CAS and its forks. FriCAS (optionally) allows running Aldor programs. Both languages
share a similar syntax and a sophisticated (dependent) type system.

FriCAS is comprehensively documented and available as source code and as a binary distribution for the most common
platforms. Compiling the sources requires besides other prerequisites a Common Lisp environment (whereby
many of the major implementations are supported and freely available as open source).

FriCAS runs on many POSIX platforms such as Linux, macOS, Unix,
BSD as well as under Cygwin and
Microsoft Windows (WSL).

History 

FriCAS is a descendant of Axiom

which itself has its origin in Scratchpad, a project that started in 1965 by James Griesmer 

at IBM laboratories.
For more details see Axiom/History.

Examples 

FriCAS has a largely complete implementation of the 
Risch–Bronstein–Trager algorithm.

Another useful feature is stream:

)set stream calculate 5
exp_series := series(exp x, x=0)

Type: UnivariatePuiseuxSeries(Expression(Integer),x,0)

So any coefficient may be retrieved, for instance :

coefficient(exp_series,40)

Type: Expression(Integer)

See also

List of computer algebra systems

References

External links 
 FriCAS Homepage
 FriCAS Wiki
 SandBox: Try FriCAS online
 Documentation at fricas.github.io
 FriCAS API (sphinx)
 Source code repositories: SourceForge, GitHub
 Rosetta stone (pdf)
 Rosetta stone (some other formats)
 Rosetta Stone (html)
 rosettacode.org, Category:SPAD
 Forum: fricas-devel
 FriCAS Jupyter Kernel (jfricas/src)
 FriCAS Jupyter (pypi) 
Related:
 Axiom
 OpenAxiom
 A# programming language
 Aldor programming language

Common Lisp (programming language) software
Computer algebra system software for Linux
Free computer algebra systems
Free software programmed in Lisp
Software using the BSD license